The Northern Lights Council of the Boy Scouts of America is the local Boy Scout council that serves all of North Dakota, parts of South Dakota, northwestern Minnesota, and northeast Montana.

As of 2017, the Northern Lights Council delivers Scouting to more than 10,000 members and 3,000 registered volunteers. The Northern Lights Council is the second largest Council geographically of the more than 260 BSA Councils in the United States.

History
The council formed in 1974 when several councils (Red River Valley Council - Fargo, Lake Agassiz Council - Grand Forks, Missouri Valley Council - Bismarck, and Great Plains Council - Minot) were merged into one.

Organization
The Northern Lights Council is divided into 8 districts:
Frontier Trails District
Great Plains District
Lake Agassiz District
Prairie Fire District
Northern Sky District
Roughrider District
Tomahawk District

Camps

Northern Lights Council is home to Camp Wilderness a  summer camp located along Bad Axe Lake near Emmaville in Hubbard County, Minnesota. The camp was founded by Herman Stern and other businessmen of the region in 1946.

Camp Wilderness is a  camp. On August 18, 2006, in commemoration for the camp's 60th anniversary, the council celebrated the dedication of the Butler Wilderness Outpost, a wooden encampment designed for an all-summer Cub Scout camp. The outpost opened for its first summer season in June 2007.

Other camps
Heart Butte Scout Reservation, near Lake Tschida in North Dakota 
Big 4 Scout Camp, west of Minot, North Dakota 
Tom Brantner Memorial Camp, near Glyndon, Minnesota

Order of the Arrow

Pa-Hin Lodge 27 is the local lodge of the Order of the Arrow for the Northern Lights Council. The Pa-Hin Lodge was chartered in 1977 and serves Boy Scouts in the states of North Dakota, Minnesota, Montana, and South Dakota. The Pa-Hin Lodge started on January 1, 1977 through the merger of four lodges.

The four Lodges which merged to form Pa-Hin were:
 Thunderbird Lodge (371) (last charter expired on December 31, 1976)
 Chan-O-Wapi Lodge (52) (last charter expired on December 31, 1976)
 Minniduta Lodge (176) (last charter expired on December 31, 1976)
 Chatoka Lodge (183) (last charter expired on December 31, 1976)

From 1977 through approximately 1980, the former lodges continued to conduct operations as tribes (example: the Thunderbird Tribe), holding conclaves and OA events along the old lodge lines. Around 1980, the tribes structure was dis-established and operations were organized as Chapters, aligning chapters based on the District structure established by the Northern Lights Council.

The 2014 Roster count was over 600 registered members. Pa-Hin is a Lakota (Sioux) word meaning porcupine. Variations of spelling include pȟahíŋ (Lakota), phahį́ (Dakota), and pahį́ (Assiniboine).

The totem of the Pa-Hin Lodge is the porcupine, but the Lodge's common logo shows a porcupine with a saber tooth.

See also
Scouting in North Dakota
Scouting in Minnesota
Scouting in South Dakota
Scouting in Montana

References

Youth organizations based in North Dakota
Central Region (Boy Scouts of America)
Local councils of the Boy Scouts of America
1974 establishments in North Dakota